Senotherapy is an early-stage basic research field for development of possible therapeutic agents and strategies to specifically target cellular senescence, an altered cell state associated with ageing and age-related diseases. The name derives from intent of the proposed anti-aging drug to halt "senescence". As of 2019, much of the research remains preliminary and there are no drugs approved for this purpose.

Types 

Senotherapeutics include:

Geroprotectors – agents/strategies which prevent or reverse the senescent state by preventing triggers of cellular senescence, such as DNA damage, oxidative stress, proteotoxic stress, telomere shortening  (i.e. telomerase activators).

 SASP inhibitors – agents interfering with pro-inflammatory senescence-associated secretory phenotype (SASP) production, including:
Glucocorticoids as potent suppressors of selected components of the SASP
Statins such as simvastatin, that can reduce the expression of pro-inflammatory cytokines (IL-6, IL-8, and MCP-1)
JAK1/2 inhibitors such as ruxolitinib
NF-κB and p38 inhibitors
IL-1α blockers
 Mitochondrial depleters in the case of impaired mitophagy

Senolytics – small molecules that specifically induce cell death in senescent cells, targeting survival pathways and anti-apoptotic mechanisms, antibodies and antibody-mediated drug delivery medications. Unlike SASP inhibitors, senolytics can be effective by intermittent rather than continuous application.

 Senomorphics – small molecules that suppress senescent phenotypes without cell killing

Gene therapy strategies – edit the genes of the cells of an organism in order to increase their resistance to aging, senile diseases and to prolong the life of the organism

See also 
 Geroprotector
 Senolytic

References

Further reading 

 
 
 
 
 

 
Senescence